The Marquis St. Evrémonde is a fictional character in Charles Dickens' 1859 novel A Tale of Two Cities.

Overview
The Marquis or Monseigneur St. Evrémonde appears (in life) for only three chapters in Book the Second, symbolizing the pitiless, arrogant, French aristocracy.  About 60 years old, with a face like a mask, he is Charles Darnay's uncle and younger twin brother of Charles Darnay's father (now deceased).

Marquis in Paris
While still handsome, fashionable, and exquisitely poised, the Marquis St. Evrémonde is out of favor at the royal court for reasons that are not specified.  In "Monseigneur in Town", the Marquis is greeted without warmth by "Monseigneur" (a great lord and senior courtier) at the latter's Parisian reception.  Snubbed, he waits until all Monseigneur's sycophants and hangers-on file out, then murmurs a curse sending Monseigneur to the Devil.  (The curse is uttered in a mirrored salon, possibly suggesting that it rebounds on the speaker.) The Marquis St. Evrémonde's carriage heads for his country chateau through the streets of Paris, at the break-neck pace favored by the nobility.  Although most pedestrians scatter in terror, his carriage runs over a little child; being one of Gaspard's.  The Marquis shows no remorse at the sight of the crushed body — inquiring whether his horses are all right — and, "with the air of a gentleman who had accidentally broke some common thing, and had paid for it", throws a gold coin to the distraught father. The Defarges appear—Ernest Defarge to comfort the grieving Gaspard; Madame Defarge to stand erect, stare at the Marquis boldly in the face and knit his Fate. The remainder of the crowd watches in cowed silence but an unknown hand throws the coin back into the carriage. Before driving on, the Marquis responds with cold contempt that he would willingly ride over any of "you dogs" and exterminate them. This scene foreshadows the oncoming revolution in France.

Marquis at his estate
The Marquis St. Evrémonde appears in the two following chapters "Monseigneur in the Country" (when he is told by a road worker that a dust-covered figure was hanging on to the bottom of his carriage) and "the "Gorgon's Head" (dining with his nephew, Charles Darnay). Dickens uses his account of the journey of the indifferent Marquis through the countryside surrounding his chateau to graphically describe the poverty and desperation of the peasantry.

During the dinner between uncle and nephew, Charles Darnay apologizes for being detained in London.  He alludes to his danger there (his recent treason trial) wondering aloud if his uncle did not in fact orchestrate the accusations brought against him.  Charles further believes that if the Marquis were still in the French Court's good graces, he would obtain a lettre de cachet and have his nephew imprisoned in France.  His uncle confesses that for the honor of the family, he would do exactly that.

The dinner conversation between uncle and nephew reveals their diametrically opposed view of the rural peasantry.  St. Evrémonde the elder considers it an obligation of his family station to subjugate "the vulgar" ("Repression is the only lasting philosophy…"). He regrets that recent reforms have placed some restraints on the formerly absolute powers of his class to abuse their inferiors, recalling that at an earlier date a peasant had been poniarded in a neighbouring room for "professing some insolent delicacy respecting his daughter".  Charles Darnay, by contrast, hopes to honor his mother's dying wish by ameliorating the wrongs the family has caused.  When his uncle laughs at this, Charles renounces his rights to the Evrémonde title and lands, in favor of a new life in London.  His uncle, slyly, already knows that this "new life" includes an emigree doctor and his daughter.

They retire for the night.

Death of the Marquis and aftermath
At the conclusion of Chapter 9, the Marquis is found stabbed to death in his bed. “The Gorgon had surveyed the building again in the night, and had added the one stone face wanting; the stone face for which it had waited through about two hundred years." (Chapter 9). All of his property is inherited by Darnay, who remains in London but instructs an agent to redress grievances, so far as is possible in the growing confusion of the pending revolution.

A year later Gaspard, assassin of the Marquis and father of the child ridden down by his carriage, is captured and executed. His body is left hanging above the village water fountain. Subsequently the Evrémonde chateau is burned to the ground at night by "Jacques" revolutionaries while the abused villagers watch in grim silence and the officers of a neighboring royal garrison stand helpless because they know that their soldiers will probably no longer obey their orders.

Only later in the novel, during the trial of Charles Darnay, is the secret of the Marquis and his brother exposed: Alexandre Manette's diary from the Bastille details how in 1767 the Evrémonde brothers (the younger initially helped by the elder) had abducted and abused a pregnant peasant wife causing her death, fatally wounded her brother who tried to protect her and had brought about the deaths of both the girl's husband and father as well. Manette tries to alert the authorities to the Evrémonde crimes but his letter is passed on to the aristocratic brothers. This was the reason he was imprisoned in the Bastille; likewise this was the inspiration of a lifelong hatred of the Evrémondes by the last member of the wronged girl's family - her sister Madame Defarge who married Manette's servant Ernest Defarge.

Names
The Marquis St. Evrémonde is referred to as "Monseigneur" and "Monsieur." These three different titles all refer to the same person: people who are below the Marquis in rank refer to him as "Monseigneur" or "Monsieur," while people of equal rank refer to him as the "Marquis."

The patronym "Evrémonde", suggests an Anglo-French conglomerate, ("every" plus "tout le monde").  Phonetically, it sounds like “Everyman.”
And, when the phrases "evre" and "monde" are separately translated from French into English, they mean fever and world, making the name "Feverworld".

The note on the knife in the Marquis chest is signed "Jacques"; a common nickname used by the aristocracy for the peasant was "Jacques Goodman".

Cinematic and Theatrical Portrayals
In the 2008 Broadway musical adaptation of 'A Tale of Two Cities,' the Marquis St. Evrémonde is played by Les Minski.

On film he has been played by such actors as Basil Rathbone (1935) and Christopher Lee (1958). In 2003, the Rathbone portrayal of St. Evrémonde was nominated for AFI's 100 Years...100 Heroes and Villains as one of the Top 50 Villains.

On television, he has been portrayed by Barry Morse (1980), Max Adrian (1958), Jerome Willis (1965), Heron Carvic (1957), Morris Perry (1980) and Jean-Marc Bory (1989).

On radio he has been portrayed by John Moffatt and Clive Merrison.

References

Literary characters introduced in 1859
A Tale of Two Cities characters
Fictional marquesses and marchionesses
Fictional French people in literature
Fictional murderers
Fictional rapists
Male literary villains
Male characters in film
Male characters in literature